This was the first edition of the tournament.

Lukáš Lacko won the title after defeating Luca Vanni 4–6, 7–6(7–3), 6–4 in the final.

Seeds

Draw

Finals

Top half

Bottom half

References
Main Draw
Qualifying Draw

Glasgow Trophy - Singles
2018 Singles